Bako is both a surname and a given name. The accented Bakó is the Hungarian name of the Romanian city of Bacău. Bakó is also a Hungarian surname.

Notable people with the name include:

Bako
Surname:
Brigitte Bako (born 1967), Canadian actress
Ibrahim Bako (1943–1983), Nigerian senior officer in the Nigerian Army 
Ishaya Bako (born 1986), Nigerian film director and screenwriter
Jarosław Bako (born 1964), Polish footballer
Muhammadu Bako III (born 1972), Emir of New Karshi in Nigeria North Central State of Nasarawa and a former career federal civil servant
Paul Bako (born 1972), American baseball player
Sadissou Bako (born 1976), Cameroonian footballer 
Tisan Bako, Nigerian radio personality and presenter
Yakubu Bako, Nigerian governor of Akwa Ibom State, Nigeria 
Yolanda Bako (born 1946), American feminist and activist against domestic violence

Middle name
Dahiru Bako Gassol (born 1954), Nigerian Senator for the Taraba Central Senatorial District of Taraba State, Nigeria
Nassirou Bako Arifari (born 1962), Beninese politician, academician, government minister
Simon Bako Lalong (born 1963), Nigerian lawyer and politician, Governor of Plateau State, Nigeria

Given name:
Bako Dagnon (1948/1953–2015), Malian griot singer
Bako Ratsifa (born 1964), Malagasy swimmer
Bako Sahakyan (born 1959), president of Artsakh
Bako Touré (1939–2001), Malian footballer

Nickname: 
Bako (footballer), the nickname of Lebanese footballer Abou Bakr Al-Mel

Bakó
László Bakó (1872–1928), Hungarian actor
Pál Bakó (born 1946), Hungarian former modern pentathlete
Zoltán Bakó (born 1951), Hungarian sprint canoeist